Suprabhaatham (സുപ്രഭാതം) is a Malayalam daily newspaper owned and published by Kozhikode Iqrau Publications from Kozhikode on behalf of the EK faction of the Samastha Kerala Jamiyyathul Ulama, a Sunni organisation based in Kerala. The daily publishing from Kerala, India. It is the first Malayalam daily to be published with six editions. The word " Suprabhaatham" translates to literally "auspicious dawn". It is the tenth most widely read newspaper daily in Kerala. The newspaper has various editions from Kozhikode, Malappuram, Kannur, Trissur, Kochi, Thiruvananthapuram and Palakkad in Kerala. It headquartered at Francis Road, Kozhikode, Kerala

History 
Kozhikode Iqrau Publication has launched the daily on 1 September 2014 by Oommen Chandy, the then Chief Minister of Kerala. It is the first Malayalam daily to be published with six editions. Suprabhaatham has 7 print editions published from Kozhikode, Kochi, Malappuram, Kannur, Thrissur palakkad and Thiruvananthapuram. The daily has readership across Kerala as well as among the ethnic Malayali population of Lakshadweep, Dakshina Kannada, Kodagu and Nilgiri. It is the first Malayalam news which has got initial circulation of more than three lakhs. Late Kottumala Bappu Musliyar was the founding chairman.

Organization 
Bahauddeen Muhammed Nadwi is the Editor. Navas Poonoor is the Managing Editor. A. Sajeevan is the Executive Editor. Sayyid Muhammad Jifri Muthukkoya Thangal is the chairman of the management while Bahauddeen Muhammed Nadwi, Abdul Hameed Faizee are the directors & CEO. Musthafa Mundupara and director Maniyoor Ahmad Musliyar is the chief patron of suprabhaatham.

References 

Malayalam-language newspapers
Newspapers published in Kerala
Daily newspapers published in India
Publications established in 2014
2014 establishments in Kerala